Hiram (International title: Stolen Moments / ) is a 2004 Philippine television drama series broadcast by ABS-CBN's Primetime Bida evening block and worldwide on The Filipino Channel. It aired from July 12, 2004 to May 20, 2005 replacing Sana'y Wala Nang Wakas. Directed by Jerry Lopez Sineneng, it stars Kris Aquino, Dina Bonnevie, Heart Evangelista, Anne Curtis, and Geoff Eigenmann.

The show has re-aired from August 16, 2006 to December 31, 2007 on the now defunct Pinoy Central TV and again in 2008 on the revamped Network KPTV, now ABS-CBN Sports and Action, and in 2013 it was re-aired on Cinema One Global.

Synopsis

The story revolves around the relationships between Diana, Sophia, Beatrice, and Edward. Diana takes care of Beatrice's child Margaret after Beatrice dies. Sophia has a daughter Stephanie, from a past one night stand.

The story begins with a friendship between three females until they find themselves sacrificing their lives for one another until respective generations find themselves also fighting for the love of one man.

Cast and characters

Main cast 
Kris Aquino as Diana Benipayo-Verdadero, fondly called Hopia when she was growing up. Overweight, insecure and the youngest of the three friends, she grows up to be a beautiful television host. Diana stands as mother to Margaret, who is the love-child of her friend Beatrice (Mickey Ferriols). She fell in love with Louie (Christian Vasquez) but her true love is Edward. Character name is derived from British princess, Diana, Princess of Wales and Binibining Pilipinas-World 1992 Marina Benipayo.
Dina Bonnevie as Sophia Borromeo, "ate" (sister) of Diana and the former Beatrice. Sophia takes the lead in making decisions, which does not make her very popular. She is envious, controlling and confident. She had Stephanie when she agreed to sleep with her Chinese employer to help Diana who got in trouble when they were working in Hong Kong. Sophia pretends to be strong and ruthless but she is also in love with Edward. She had a boyfriend, Alexander (Bernard Palanca), who loves her but knows she loves Edward more. Character is derived from Spanish queen consort, Queen Sophia of Spain and Binibining Pilipinas-Universe 1964 Myrna Panlilio-Borromeo.
Heart Evangelista as Margaret Benipayo, beautiful, intelligent and sensible adopted daughter of Diana. She doesn't know the truth about her own birth. She fell in love with Harry, a simple son of a farmer whose face was disfigured. The relationship met the disapproval of Sophia, who took the opportunity to separate them when Harry suffered amnesia after a car crash. Margaret suffered when she found out that Harry was given the name Andrew and fell in love with her best friend Stephanie and Stephanie started to create her evil schemes against her. She decided to step out of the way rather than hurt her best friend. Character name is derived from English royals, Margaret Tudor and Princess Margaret, Countess of Snowdon .
Anne Curtis as Stephanie Borromeo, arrogant, ruthless, villainess, pitiless and the main female antagonist of the series and the unwanted child of Sophia. All her life she lived in the shadow of Margaret until Andrew came into her life. She hurt badly when she found out that Andrew was actually Harry and will make Margaret's life a living hell as time goes by. Stephanie is self-destructive and emotionally dependent, but she is coming to her own. Character name is derived from Portuguese queen consort,  Stephanie of Hohenzollern-Sigmaringen. 
Geoff Eigenmann as Harry Silayan/Andrew Florendo, the amnesiac victim who fell in love with two women who happened to be best friends. Harry is torn. Margaret won't take him back and won't give him a choice. Stephanie is pushing him away because of her insecurity. Everyone is anxious about whom he will choose. Character name is derived from British prince Prince Harry, Duke of Sussex/Prince Andrew, Duke of York and Binibining Pilipinas-Universe 1980 Chat Silayan/Miss Universe 1973 Margarita Moran-Florendo.
John Estrada as Edward Verdadero, the crush ng bayan when Beatrice, Diana and Sophia were growing up. Handsome, rich and gentlemanly, Edward was the ideal man for all of them. But among the three, his heart only went out for Diana. He waited 20 long years before he could propose to Diana. Character name is derived from British king, Edward VIII and Binibining Pilipinas-Universe 1984 Desiree Verdadero.
Mickey Ferriols as Beatrice, the deceased childhood friend of Sophia and Diana. Beatrice falls in love with Edward and has an affair with him. Before she dies she gives birth to a baby girl named Margaret.

Extended cast 
 Rosemarie Gil as Donya Carolina Verdadero
 Angel Aquino as Charlotte Crisostomo
 Christian Vasquez as Louie Diaz
 Ahron Villena as William
 Jaclyn Jose as Isabella
 Bernard Palanca as Alexander
 Andre Tiangco as Derek Sandico
 Tanya Gomez as Anna Silayan
 Gigette Reyes as Elizabeth
 Bong Regala as James Diaz
 Simon Ibarra as Paul
 Dick Israel as Diana's abusive uncle
 Pilar Pilapil as Sophia's abandoned mother
 Lito Legaspi as Don Felipe Verdadero
 Katrina Michelle Legaspi as young Diana
 Rache Mae Manantan as young Sophia
 Angelina Marie Plummer as young Beatrice
 Jardson Librando as young Edward
 Julia Montes as Young Stephanie Borromeo
 Winchell Eric Ave as Mark best friend of Andrew Florendo in Cordillera

Production crew
 Executive in Charge of Production: Malou N. Santos
 Executive in Charge of Creative: Henry King Quitain
 Creative director: Olivia M. Lamasan
 Production director: Cathy O. Perez
 Creative Manager: Jake Tordesillas
 Executive Producer: Des D. Tanwangco
 Headwriter: Henry King Quitain
 Directed by: Jerry Lopez Sineneng

International broadcast

References

See also
List of programs previously aired by ABS-CBN
List of ABS-CBN drama series

2004 Philippine television series debuts
2005 Philippine television series endings
Television series by Star Creatives
ABS-CBN drama series
Filipino-language television shows
Television shows set in the Philippines